Tu Noche con Los Tigres del Norte is a 2009 live album by Regional Mexican band Los Tigres del Norte. This album won a 52nd Annual GRAMMY Award® for Best Norteno Album.

Tracks
Intro 
Somos Mas Americanos - (Uniendo Fronteras)
Los Dos Plebes - (Los Dos Plebes)
Cuestion Olvidada - (Unidos Para Siempre)
Mis Dos Patrias - (Jefe de Jefes)
Ayudame A Creer - (Pacto De Sangre)
Cesar Chavez - (Triunfo Solido)
Sangre Caliente - (Raices)
La Dieta - (Incansables!)
Me Regalo Contigo - (La Reina Del Sur)
Tres Veces Mojado - (Idolos Del Pueblo)
El Niño Y La Boda - (Idolos Del Pueblo)
Amigos y Mujeres - (La Garra De..)
La Fuga Del Rojo - (El Tahur)

References

Los Tigres del Norte live albums
2009 live albums
Fonovisa Records live albums
Spanish-language live albums